Oleh Mikhniuk (Ukrainian, Міхнюк Олег Іванович, 27 October 1965 – 20 August 2014) was a Ukrainian activist and soldier. He served in the armed forces of the Soviet Union during the Soviet–Afghan War. He participated in the Euromaidan. He was killed in action fighting against the rebel forces in the Donbas. He was a recipient of Ukraine's Order of Gold Star and the Order for Courage. On August 21, 2015, he was posthumously made a Hero of Ukraine.

See also
 List of heroes of Ukraine
 List of people from Ukraine

References

1965 births
2014 deaths
Recipients of the Order of Gold Star (Ukraine)
Chevaliers of the Order For Courage, 1st class
Recipients of the Order For Courage, 3rd class
People of the Soviet–Afghan War
People of the Euromaidan
People from Chernihiv Oblast
Ukrainian military personnel of the war in Donbas
Ukrainian military personnel killed in the Russo-Ukrainian War
Military personnel killed in war in Donbas